The 1998 St Helens Metropolitan Borough Council election took place on 7 May 1998 to elect members of St Helens Metropolitan Borough Council in Merseyside, England. One third of the council was up for election and the Labour Party stayed in overall control of the council.

After the election, the composition of the council was:
Labour 42
Liberal Democrats 10
Conservative 2

Election result
Both the Labour and Liberal Democrat group leaders said that they were pleased with the election results. Labour held control of the council after winning 13 of the 19 seats contested, leaving the party with 42 councillors. However the Liberal Democrats gained a seat in Newton East from Labour to have 10 seats and there was a vote swing from Labour to the Liberal Democrats. Meanwhile, the Conservatives gained 1 seat, after taking Rainford, to have 2 councillors.

Ward results

By-elections between 1998 and 1999

Marshalls Cross

Newton West
A by-election took place in Newton West on 21 January 1999 to replace Labour councillor Martin Schofield. The seat was gained for the Liberal Democrats by Virginia Taylor with a majority of 145 votes over Labour's Thomas Chisnall after a 25% swing.

Thatto Heath

References

1998 English local elections
1998
1990s in Merseyside